Henry Mack McLaughlin (August 24, 1886 – March 18, 1922) was an American Negro league pitcher in the 1910s.

A native of Brookhaven, Mississippi, McLaughlin made his Negro leagues debut in 1912 with the French Lick Plutos. He later played for the West Baden Sprudels, and finished his career with the Lincoln Giants from 1917 to 1919. McLaughlin died in Los Angeles, California in 1922 at age 35.

References

External links
  and Seamheads

1886 births
1922 deaths
French Lick Plutos players
Lincoln Giants players
West Baden Sprudels players
Baseball pitchers
Baseball players from Mississippi
People from Brookhaven, Mississippi
20th-century African-American people